Queen of Air and Darkness may refer to:

Characters
 A character in a poem from A. E. Housman's Last Poems, III (1922) 
 Andais, a character in the Merry Gentry novel series by Laurell K. Hamilton
 Moire, a character in the novel The Element of Fire by Martha Wells
 A title of Mab, the Faery Queen of Winter, a character in The Dresden Files series by Jim Butcher
 Queen of Air and Darkness (Dungeons & Dragons), a deity in the Dungeons & Dragons game
 Queen of Air and Darkness, a character in the novel War for the Oaks by Emma Bull
 Title of the character Cassie in the novel The Delirium Brief by Charles Stross

Fictional works
 The Queen of Air and Darkness, a 1939 novel by T. H. White, second volume of The Once and Future King
 The Queen of Air and Darkness (novella), a 1971 novella by Poul Anderson in his History of Rustum universe
 Queen of Air and Darkness (Clare novel), a 2018 dark fantasy novel by Cassandra Clare

Other
 "Queen of Air and Darkness", a track on the Cauda Pavonis album Pistols at Dawn

See also
 Queen of Darkness (disambiguation)